Faslane (Her Majesty's Naval Base Clyde) is a Royal Navy base on the Gare Loch, Argyll and Bute, Scotland.

Faslane can also refer to:
Faslane (bay), the geographical bay where the naval base has been built
Faslane Castle, Shandon Castle, and St Michael's Chapel, ruinous sites of former castles and chapels in the area of Faslane
Faslane Peace Camp, a permanent camp of anti-nuclear weapon protestors, based outside the naval base

See also
Fastlane (disambiguation)